Bolshekozyrevskoye is a rural locality (a selo) in Chernyayevsky Selsoviet, Kizlyarsky District, Republic of Dagestan, Russia. The population was 141 as of 2010. There is one street.

Geography
Chernyayevka and Novovladimirskoye are the nearest rural localities.

Nationalities
Dargins, Avars, Russians and Chechens live there.

References

Rural localities in Kizlyarsky District